Ira Coleman (born April 29, 1956) is a French-American jazz bassist.

Educated at the Berklee College of Music, he appears on four albums by Paris-based pianist Laurent de Wilde and has worked with artists such as Dee Dee Bridgewater, Milt Jackson, Ulf Wakenius, John Esposito, Joanne Brackeen, Herbie Hancock, Sting, Tony Williams, Ayọ and Antonio Farao.

Discography 
1985: Keys to the City – Mulgrew Miller
1990: Evidence – Vincent Herring
1991: Dawnbird – Vincent Herring
1992: Live at the Blue Note – Franco Ambrosetti
1993: Folklore: Live at the Village Vanguard – Vincent Herring
1993: Secret Love - Vincent Herring
1993: Tokyo Live - Tony Williams
1994: New York Romance - Barney Wilen
1994: In from the Cold – Jonny King
1994: Power Talk – Joanne Brackeen
1996: Below the Bassline – Ernest Ranglin, with Idris Muhammad, Gary Mayone, Monty Alexander
1997: Rencontre – Georges Arvanitas
1998: Gershwin's World – Herbie Hancock 
1998: Black Inside – Antonio Faraò, Jeff Tain Watts (ENJA Records)
1998: Mirrors – Joe Chambers
2000: Tunga – Mamadou Diabate
2002: This Is New – Dee Dee Bridgewater
2002: Sings All Love - Grady Tate
2002: Soul on Jazz – Philip Bailey
2003: The Creator Has a Master Plan – Pharoah Sanders
2005: J'ai Deux Amours – Dee Dee Bridgewater
2013: Evan – Antonio Faraò
2016: Landscapes - Joe Chambers

References 

American jazz double-bassists
Male double-bassists
Living people
American session musicians
Place of birth missing (living people)
1956 births
Enja Records artists
Blue Note Records artists
Criss Cross Jazz artists
21st-century double-bassists
21st-century American male musicians
American male jazz musicians